Saint-Chartier is a commune in the Indre department in central France. The writer Raymonde Vincent (1908–1985), winner of the Prix Femina in 1937 died in Saint-Chartier.

Population

See also
Communes of the Indre department

References

Communes of Indre